Nguyễn Thanh Bình (born 2 November 2000) is a Vietnamese professional footballer who plays as a defender for Viettel and the Vietnam national team.

International career
On 7 September 2021, Thanh Bình made his debut for the national team, against Australia in 2022 FIFA World Cup qualification, in a match that ended 1–0 loss. He was heavily criticized by fans after making the mistake of letting China score a goal in injury time, making Vietnam lose 2–3 on 7 October 2021. 

On 29 March 2022, he scored his first goal for Vietnam with a header, against Japan, making Vietnam get a historic draw to end the 2022 FIFA World Cup campaign with 4 points.

Career statistics

International

International goals
Scores and results list Vietnam's goal tally first.

Honours
Bình Định 
V.League 2: 2020
Vietnam U23
Southeast Asian Games: 2021
Vietnam
AFF Championship runner-up: 2022
VFF Cup: 2022

References

External links

2000 births
Living people
Vietnamese footballers
Vietnam international footballers
Association football defenders
V.League 1 players
Viettel FC players
Competitors at the 2021 Southeast Asian Games
Southeast Asian Games competitors for Vietnam